National Highway 331 (NH 331) is a  National Highway in India.

References

National highways in India